Khalīl al-Khūrī (28 October 1836, Choueifat — 26 October 1907) was a central figure of the Nahda.
He was the owner of Hadiqat Al Akhbar ('The News Garden', 1858–1911), the first Arabic newspaper in Beirut, the origins of which may be pinpointed to a group of Syrians assembled at the forgotten Médawar Literary Circle. Quoting Jens Hanssen and Hicham Safieddine, he "was the first to popularize a sense of Syrian identity."

In the words of Basiliyus Bawardi, he "believed that an adoption of a new Western literary genre into the traditional Arabic literary tradition would provide the Arab culture with tools for reviving the Arabic language and create new styles of expression." Hadiqat al-Akhbar "was the first Arabic newspaper to publish translations from Western narrative fiction, especially from the French Romance stories." Khuri also published a fictional narrative of his own, Wayy, Idhan Lastu bi-Ifranji ('Alas, I Am Not a Foreigner'), in Hadiqat Al Akhbar (1859–61). The literary activity of the newspaper "played a substantial role in changing the aesthetic literary taste, and paved the way for the birth of an authentic Arabic narrative fiction."

References

Sources

Further reading

1836 births
1907 deaths
Nahda
Syrian newspaper founders
Syrian nationalism